Lovely Man is a 2011 Indonesian film written and directed by Teddy Soeriaatmadja. The film had its world premiere at the 2011 Busan International Film Festival to positive reviews on the segment "A Window on Asian Cinema". Donny Damara plays the starring role as Syaiful/Ipuy, a transgender woman in Jakarta. Actress Raihaanun plays the female leading role as Cahaya, Syaiful's long-lost 19-year-old daughter who comes to the city to look for him only to find out that her father is a transgender woman. This is their second film together after 2007 remake of drama Badai Pasti Berlalu.

The film generated controversy in its native Indonesia due to rejections from the Islamic Defenders Front but saw overwhelming reception abroad through screenings at various international film festivals.

Plot
Lovely Man tells the story of Cahaya, a 19-year-old girl with strong Islamic values, who discovers that her long lost father is a transgender woman working on the streets of Jakarta. The story unfolds over that one night as they walk the streets of Jakarta and explains how the encounter changes their lives, as they learn about love, loss and redemption.

Cahaya arrives in Jakarta from what can be assumed is her small town home just as the sun is setting. Armed with a piece of notepaper and a few rupiah, she's in the city on a search for the father she hasn't seen since she was four. Asking neighbors and shopkeepers in the area he lives in for Syaiful gets her blank stares in return. When they finally figure out she means Ipuy, they point her in the right direction and say he's “working” around Taman Lawang (Jakarta's infamous spot for transgender sex workers). Cahaya, naturally, goes looking for an office building or store.

When she locates Ipuy (Damara), she finds a transvestite prostitute plying her trade on the streets. In the initial minutes after encountering each other, both are shocked at the turn of evens. The innocent Cahaya is crushed at her father's choices; Ipuy is horrified to see the daughter he willfully left behind.

Cast
 Donny Damara as Syaiful/Ipuy, Cahaya's transgender father
 Raihaanun as Cahaya, a devout 19-year old Muslim girl
 Yayu Unru 
 Ari Syarif 
 Lani Sonda

Production

Development 
Soeriaatmadja first came up with an idea for the film in 2003, when he saw a transgender woman and a veiled woman talking on the side of a street. He started development on the script in 2011. During script development, Raihaanun, who is Soeriaatmadja's wife, expressed interest in the film. As a result, Soeriaatmadja rewrote the character of Cahaya for her.

The film was made with a very small budget, which director Soeriaatmadja referred to as the "survival technique."

Release 
The film had its world premiere at the 2011 Busan International Film Festival in the segment "A Window on Asian Cinema." The segment also screened Ari Sihasale's Serdadu Kumbang and Salaman Aristo's Jakarta Maghrib.

In October 2013, it was screened for the London Indonesian Film Screenings at the London University School of African and Oriental Studies (SOAS). Other films screened were Paul Agusta's Parts of the Heart, Eugene Panji's Cita-Citaku Setinggi Tanah, Rahung Nasution's Mentawai Tattoo Revival, Yosep Anggi Noen's Peculiar Vacation and Other Ilnesses, and Riri Riza's three features: Kuldesak, 3 Hari untuk Selamanya, and Atambua 39 Celsius.

Initially, Soeriaatmadja did not have plans to release the film because he was concerned about a possible controversy revolving around a scene in the film where Cahaya takes off her veil. However, after participating in the Q! Film Festival, the film garnered attention in the Indonesian LGBT community. Nevertheless, its release garnered controversy due to rejections from the Islamic Defenders Front. The film still saw limited release in several theaters throughout the country on May 10, 2012.

The film was screened at the following film festivals:
 Official Selection of the 2011 Mumbai Film Festival, India
 Official Selection of the 2011 World Film Festival of Bangkok, Thailand
 Official Selection of the 2011 Hong Kong International Film Festival
 In Competition at the 2011 Asiatica Filmmediale, Rome, Italy
 In Competition at the 2011 Bangalore International Film Festival, India
 In Competition at the 2011 New Delhi Digital Film Festival, India
 In Competition at the 2011 Torino LGBT Film Festival, Italy
 In Competition at the 2012 Indonesian Film Festival, Yogyakarta, Indonesia
 In Competition at the 2012 Tel Aviv International LGBT Film Festival, Israel
 In Competition at the 2012 Osaka Asian Film Festival, Japan
 In Competition at the 2012 Tiburon International Film Festival, California, United States
 2011 Jogja-Netpac Asia Film Festival, Yogyakarta, Indonesia
 2011 Hua Hin Film Festival, Bangkok, Thailand
 2011 Q! Film Festival, Jakarta, Indonesia
 2011 CinemAsia Film Festival, Amsterdam, Netherlands
 2012 Melbourne Indonesian Film Festival, Victoria, Australia
 2012 Palm Springs International Film Festival, California, United States
 Closing Film at the 2012 Balinale International Film Festival, Bali, Indonesia
 Opening Film at the 2013 Indonesian Film Mini Festival, Washington D. C., United States

Reception
In a positive review, Elizabeth Kerr of The Hollywood Reporter also singled out Damara's performance, calling it "Damara's show" while adding that "with his square jaw and heavy brow, Damara jettisons excessive mannerisms for little details (playing with his eyelashes, fidgeting with his wig) and stays respectful of Ipuy. He uses words as weapons and comports himself in a way that makes clear the status transgender people hold in the world. When he finally relates to Cahaya as Saiful, his ruggedly handsome features carry a melancholy that speaks to what happens after the film is over. Ipuy is in trouble with some local gangsters and after he sends Cahaya home with a promise never to contact him again, it’s clear how the story truly ends."

Los Angeles Times film critic Betsy Sharkey praised Soeriaatmadja's work, calling it "a moving one-act play on human connections and the power of love and forgiveness to change lives".

Indonesian film critic Adrian Jonathan Pasaribu highlighted Soeriaatmadja's bravery in depicting the relationship between a transgender woman and a devout Muslim woman. He further noted that the film does not overcrowd itself with social context, instead letting the viewers make their own conclusions about transgender people and Muslims. Pasaribu also praised Soeriaatmadja's minimalist direction, calling it his best directorial work so far.

Accolades
The film received many awards and nominations, both domestic and international. Donny Damara received rave reviews for his performance as Syaiful/Ipul, resulting in a Best Actor accolade from Maya Awards, Asian Film Awards, and the Indonesian Oscar-equivalent Citra Awards. The film has been credited for reviving Damara's career as a film actor.

References

External links
 Lovely Man at IMDb

Maya Award winners
Citra Award winners
2011 LGBT-related films
2011 films
Indonesian LGBT-related films
Films shot in Indonesia
Films about trans women